Chevrolet-Saturn of Harlem, Inc., was a car dealership in the East Harlem neighborhood in New York City.  Originally touted as a minority-owned dealership and part of the only new-car facility in Harlem, it was abandoned by its original operator within months and was taken over by General Motors directly.  On June 1, 2009, it was used as the lead company in the General Motors Chapter 11 reorganization filing in New York.

Overview 
The Harlem auto mall opened in February 2006 but had its ceremonial opening on June 2, 2006. Located between 2nd and 3rd Avenues at 127th Street in East Harlem, it was the largest dealership complex in Manhattan, the only new-vehicle dealerships north of 57th Street, and the first new-vehicle dealerships in Harlem in 40 years.  Run by Otis Thornton, a black man and Buick dealer in East Brunswick, New Jersey, the Chevy and Saturn dealership in the Mall received attention for being a large, new minority-owned business: the opening was attended by Jesse Jackson, New York mayor Michael Bloomberg, General Motors chairman and CEO Rick Wagoner, New York City Economic Development Corporation president Andrew Alper, and New York City Department of Transportation commissioner Iris Weinshall.

The dealership was funded with $60,000,000 in private investment and $17,000,000 in tax-exempt empowerment zone bonds from the NYCEDC's New York City Industrial Development Agency, used city-owned land leased through the adjacent car dealer in the Harlem Auto Mall, and was advertised by the city government as "bringing 150 new jobs to Harlem to date with expected growth up to 200 jobs".

However, Otis Thornton quit in December 2006, and General Motors took direct control of the company, planning to maintain it until another owner could be found.

On June 1, 2009, Chevrolet-Saturn of Harlem was the first GM company to file Chapter 11 bankruptcy, in order for the United States Bankruptcy Court for the Southern District of New York to obtain jurisdiction over the entire General Motors Chapter 11 reorganization.  General Motors Corporation and its other subsidiaries filed in the same court moments later.  The same morning, despite the filings, a man at the dealership told the media he was the dealership's "owner" but refused to identify himself or comment on the bankruptcy.

General Motors closed the dealership in January 2011.

References

Auto dealerships of the United States
General Motors subsidiaries
Former auto dealerships
East Harlem
Chevrolet
Saturn Corporation
Defunct companies based in New York City
Retailing in New York City
American companies established in 2006
Retail companies established in 2006
Retail companies disestablished in 2009
Companies that filed for Chapter 11 bankruptcy in 2009
2006 establishments in New York City
2009 disestablishments in New York (state)